Lukman Olayemi Hussein (born 28 August 1996) is a Nigerian footballer who currently plays as a defender for  Drenica.

Career statistics

Club

Notes

Honours

Club 
Tirana
Albanian Supercup: 2022

References

1996 births
Living people
Sportspeople from Lagos
Nigerian footballers
Nigerian expatriate footballers
Association football defenders
Kategoria e Parë players
KS Burreli players
KS Kastrioti players
Nigerian expatriate sportspeople in Albania
Expatriate footballers in Albania